Railway stations in the Netherlands ranked by how busy they are, with statistics from 2013 and 2014, are:

1–50

51–100

101–150

References

External links
 Dutch Railways (NS) passengers per station in 2017 and 2018
 Ridership of Dutch stations, 2013–2014 data

 Busiest
Busiest railway stations in the Netherlands